The Kindel Building is a historic automobile showroom at 1095 East Colorado Boulevard in Pasadena, California.

Description and history 
It was built in 1927-28 as James H. Kindel's auto dealership. Pasadena architects Bennett and Haskell designed it in the Italian Renaissance Revival style.

The main facade of the building features five arches supported by Corinthian columns and extensive plate glass windows displaying the showroom's interior, and the entrance includes cast iron piers and a transom with an iron grille. The McDaneld Motor Company, the Bush-Morgan Motor Company, and the Howard Motor Company all used the building as a dealership, and it was later used as a body shop.

The building was added to the National Register of Historic Places on April 18, 1996.

See also
Howard Motor Company Building, another historic Pasadena auto showroom

References

Commercial buildings on the National Register of Historic Places in California
Italian Renaissance Revival architecture in the United States
Commercial buildings completed in 1928
Buildings and structures on the National Register of Historic Places in Pasadena, California
Buildings and structures in Pasadena, California
Auto dealerships on the National Register of Historic Places
1928 establishments in California
Transportation buildings and structures on the National Register of Historic Places in California